Protein pigeon homolog also known as gamma-secretase activating protein (GSAP) is a protein that in humans is encoded by the PION gene.

Gene 

The human PION gene is located on the long (q) arm of chromosome 7 at band 11.23, from base pair 76,778,007 to base pair 76,883,653. Highly conserved PION orthologs have been identified in most vertebrates for which complete genome data are available.  More distantly related orthologs are also expressed in insects including the pigeon gene in Drosophila melanogaster that when mutated produces the "pigeon" phenotype. The name of the human PION gene derives the corresponding Drosophila gene.

Protein 

The transcribed human pigeon homolog protein is 854 amino acid residues in length. A 16 kDa fragment (GSAP-16K) derived from 121 residues from the C-terminus region of the full length protein is known as the γ-secretase activating protein (GSAP).

Function 

γ-secretase activating protein (GSAP) increases β-amyloid production through a mechanism involving its interactions with both γ-secretase and its substrate, the amyloid precursor protein (APP).  By binding to both the γ-secretase enzyme and its APP substrate, GSAP increases the affinity and the selectivity of the enzyme for this particular substrate.

Therapeutic target for Alzheimer's disease 

The activating function of GSAP can be inhibited by the anticancer drug imatinib (Gleevec) which in turn prevents γ-secretase from converting APP into plaque forming β-amyloid without affecting the other functions of γ-secretase. Imatinib itself does not get into the brain so imatinib could not be used as an AD therapeutic. However it may be possible to identify imatinib-like drugs that do get into the brain. Hence GSAP represents a potential therapeutic target for the treatment of Alzheimer's disease (AD).

The drug semagacestat in contrast to imatinib, works by directly inhibiting the γ-secretase.  While semagacestat reduces β-amyloid plaque formation in AD patients, γ-secretase is also needed to make other important proteins.  The failure of semagacestat to improve the cognitive function of AD patients may be due to its non-selective blockade of γ-secretase.  The more selective blockade of γ-secretase provided by inhibiting GSAP may make GSAP a more efficacious and safer drug target than γ-secretase.

Discovery 

The PION gene was originally discovered through a large scale genome sequencing effort. However the function of the PION gene product remained a mystery. In the laboratory of Paul Greengard, a screen of compounds that could inhibit the formation of β-amyloid identified imatinib, however it was not immediately known how it accomplished this. Later it was discovered by Greengard's lab that imatinib inhibited the function of GSAP and that GSAP in turn functions as an activator of γ-secretase.

References

Further reading